This is a discography of Japanese rock band Acid Mothers Temple & the Melting Paraiso U.F.O. and related projects.

Acid Mothers Temple & the Melting Paraiso U.F.O.

Studio albums

EPs

Singles

Live albums

Compilation albums

Video albums

Acid Maso Temple

Studio albums

Acid Mothers Afrirampo

Studio albums

Acid Mothers Gong

Studio albums

Live albums

Video albums

Acid Mothers Guru Guru

Studio albums

Live albums

Acid Mothers Guru Guru Gong

Singles

Acid Mothers Kaidan

Video albums

Acid Mothers Temple & Space Paranoid

Studio albums

Live albums

Acid Mothers Temple & The Cosmic Inferno

Studio albums

Live albums

Video albums

EPs

Singles

Acid Mothers Temple & The Pink Ladies Blues

Studio albums

EPs

Acid Mothers Temple SWR

Studio albums

Live albums

Tsurubami

Studio albums

Live albums

Yamamoto Seiichi & Acid Mothers Temple

Live albums

Acid Mothers Reynols

Studio albums

Acid Moon Temple
Acid Mothers Temple (Tsuyama Atsushi, Shimura Koji, Kawabata Makoto, Higashi Hiroshi) plus Honeymoons (Tenko, Atsuko Kamura)

Studio albums

Festivals & Tours
Albums associated with a particular festival, tour etc. featuring multiple combinations of a group of performers. Two or more tracks per album credited to different artists, but including at least one Acid Mothers Temple credit. Treated as live albums here, although some include studio recordings.

Live albums

References

Discographies of Japanese artists
Rock music discographies